In mathematics, a dependence relation is a binary relation which generalizes the relation of linear dependence.

Let  be a set.
 if , then ;
 if  is a subset of  such that  implies , then  implies ;

Remark. If  is a non-empty set with a dependence relation , then  always has a basis with respect to  Furthermore, any two bases of  have the same cardinality.

Examples
This is equivalent to the definition of linear dependence.
 Let  be a field extension of  Define  by   if  is algebraic over  Then  is a dependence relation. This is equivalent to the definition of algebraic dependence.

See also
 matroid

Linear algebra
Binary relations